The Multan Tigers was a Pakistani Domestic T20 and List A Cricket team based in Multan, Punjab, Pakistan. The team was established in 2004 and its home ground is the Multan Cricket Stadium. The manager of the Tigers is Sheikh Saleem.

Team

Squad (2015 Haier T20 Cup)
Kamran Akmal (Captain) 
Zulfiqar Babar (Vice-Captain) 
Aamer Yamin
Hasnain Bokhari
Imran Farhat
Kashif Naved
Majid Ali
Mohammad Nadeem
Naved Alam
Naved Yasin
Rahat Ali
Rizwan Haider
Shahid Iqbal
Sohaib Maqsood
Sufyan-ul-Haq
Umair Arshad
Zain Abbas 
Zeeshan Ashraf

Reserves
Gulraiz Sadaf (WK)
Saeed Anwar Jnr
Ammar Ali
Maqbool Ahmed (WK)

Former Notable Players 
 Abdur Rauf 
 Shabbir Ahmed
 Mohammad Irfan 
 Kamran Hussain
 Azharullah
 Adnan Akmal

Sponsors
Inverex Power was the main sponsor for Multan Tigers in the 2015–16 Haier T20 Cup along with Haier Pakistan, Hunt Garments and Multan Region Cricket Association (MRCA).

See also
 Faysal Bank T20 Cup
 Pakistan Super League
 2015–16 Haier T20 Cup

References

External links
Twenty 20 Record page for Multan Tigers
Cricketarchive page for Multan Tigers

Cricket clubs established in 2004
2004 establishments in Pakistan
Cricket teams in Pakistan
Tigers